Hoot Sackett was an American college baseball coach. He was the head coach at Oklahoma State University from 1920 to 1921.

In the 1921 season his Cowboy squad played a tough schedule, eight against Missouri Valley Conference schools, two with Southwest Conference teams, and several smaller state colleges. According to a Tulsa World article from 1921 the opposition was "as stiff as any encountered by A&M in recent years".

Head coaching record

References

Year of death missing
Year of birth missing
Oklahoma State Cowboys baseball coaches